Henry Nielsen (1 November 1890 – 12 May 1967) was a Danish stage and film actor.

Selected filmography
Dødsbokseren - 1926
Kys, klap og kommers - 1929
Hallo, Afrika forude - 1929
Krudt med knald - 1931
Han, hun og Hamlet - 1932
Ud i den kolde sne - 1934
Min kone er husar - 1935
Millionærdrengen - 1936
I folkets navn - 1938
Sommerglæder - 1940
Niels Pind og hans dreng - 1941
Tak fordi du kom, Nick - 1941
En søndag på Amager - 1941
Thummelumsen - 1941
Alle mand på dæk - 1942
Frøken Vildkat - 1942
Søren Søndervold - 1942
Tyrannens fald - 1942
Lykken kommer - 1942
Regnen holdt op - 1942
Alt for karrieren - 1943
Det ender med bryllup - 1943
Op med humøret - 1943
Kriminalassistent Bloch - 1943
Bedstemor går amok - 1944
Teatertosset - 1944
To som elsker hinanden - 1944
Spurve under taget - 1944
Elly Petersen - 1944
Otte akkorder - 1944
En ny dag gryer - 1945
Affæren Birte - 1945
Panik i familien - 1945
Oktoberroser - 1946
Brevet fra afdøde - 1946
Hans store aften - 1946
I Love Another - 1946
Op med lille Martha - 1946
Så mødes vi hos Tove - 1946
De pokkers unger - 1947
Sikken en nat - 1947
 The Swedenhielm Family - 1947
Når katten er ude - 1947
Stjerneskud - 1947
Ta', hvad du vil ha' - 1947
Mens porten var lukket - 1948
Tre år efter - 1948
I de lyse nætter - 1948
Den stjålne minister - 1949
For frihed og ret - 1949
Lejlighed til leje - 1949
Berlingske Tidende (film) - 1949
Kampen mod uretten - 1949
Min kone er uskyldig - 1950
Historien om Hjortholm - 1950
Mosekongen - 1950
Vores fjerde far - 1951
Fra den gamle købmandsgård - 1951
Bag de røde porte - 1951
Nålen - 1951
Dorte - 1951
Ta' Pelle med - 1952
Rekrut 67 Petersen - 1952
Kærlighedsdoktoren - 1952
Avismanden - 1952
Vi arme syndere - 1952
Den gamle mølle på Mols - 1953
Sønnen - 1953
Ved Kongelunden - 1953
Himlen er blå - 1954
I kongens klær - 1954
Jan går til filmen - 1954
Vores lille by - 1954
Bruden fra Dragstrup - 1955
Tre finder en kro - 1955
Hvad vil De ha'? - 1956
Den kloge mand (1956) - 1956
Den store gavtyv - 1956
Færgekroen - 1956
Kristiane af Marstal - 1956
Father of Four and Uncle Sofus - 1957
Sønnen fra Amerika - 1957
Tag til marked i Fjordby - 1957
Tre piger fra Jylland - 1957
Father of Four on Bornholm - 1959
Pigen i søgelyset - 1959
Eventyrrejsen - 1960
Eventyr på Mallorca - 1961
Komtessen - 1961
Støvsugerbanden - 1964
Alt for kvinden - 1964
Ih, du forbarmende - 1964
Een pige og 39 sømænd - 1965
Sytten - 1965
Hold da helt ferie - 1965
En ven i bolignøden - 1965
Der var engang - 1966
Flagermusen - 1966
Soyas tagsten - 1966
Min kones ferie - 1967

External links

Danish male stage actors
Danish male film actors
Danish male silent film actors
20th-century Danish male actors
Male actors from Copenhagen
1890 births
1967 deaths